The Croatian National Resistance, also referred to as Otpor, was an Ustaša organization founded in 1955 in Spain. The HNO ran an armed organisation, Drina, which continued to be active well into the 1970s.

The organization operated between legitimate emigre functions and a thuggish underworld. Its leaders tried to distance the organization from the acts of the so-called renegade elements. It embraced a radical nationalist ideology that differed only marginally from Ustaše ideology.

The HNO had stated in their constitution that:

[We] regard Yugoslavism and Yugoslavia as the greatest and only evil that has caused the existing calamity... We therefore consider every direct or indirect help to Yugoslavia as treason against the Croatian nation... Yugoslavia must be destroyed—be it with the help of the Russians or the Americans, of Communists, non-Communists or anti-Communists—with the help of anyone willing the destruction of Yugoslavia: destroyed by the dialectic of the word, or by dynamite—but at all costs destroyed.

The organization published its own magazine, Drina. It existed until 1991.

History 
During WWII, Croatia was occupied by Nazi Germany. Under the Nazi-supported Ustaša regime, the nation proclaimed independence and was named the Independent State of Croatia (NDH). During this time, the Ustaša political party, headed by the clerical fascist leader Ante Pavelić, controlled Croatian leadership. The NDH was supported by the Axis powers and participated in the creation and use of concentration and extermination camps. While this puppet state adapted the anti-semitic policy of the Axis powers, their goal was also to ethnically cleanse all Serbian and Roma people through acts of systematic extermination. It is thought that the war crimes and the Holocaust in Croatia during WWII committed by the Ustaša regime is what spurred some anti-Croat sentiment within some parts of the Serbian populations later on.

After WWII, Yugoslavia became a socialist state. This communist state under Tito branded the different Croat separatist groups as fascist terrorists with no goal other than to destroy the state. While this view of the Croat diaspora population was largely slanted, it did describe a small number of loosely organized groups which were in line with the Ustaše.

Otpor existed for over three decades, and while it never had more than a few thousand members worldwide, it linked a variety of notable Croatian nationalists. Otpor branches on four continents at times splintered, notably the Argentinian one under the leadership of Dinko Šakić. Šakić had lived in Argentina between 1947 and 1956, and then between 1959 and 1998.

The HNO was banned in Germany in 1976 because of their links to Zvonko Bušić and others.

In 1991, a former leader of Otpor joined the Croatian Ministry of Defence and used his underground connections to try to obtain weaponry at the time the Croatian War of Independence was starting. In August 1991, the U.S. Customs Service arrested four members of Otpor from Chicago for attempting to procure illegal weapons, including anti-aircraft missiles, and ship them to Croatia.

Leadership 
Ante Pavelić was the leader of the Independent State of Croatia, NDH, from 1941 to 1945. After fleeing Yugoslavia for war crimes committed during WWII, he spent some time in Austria and Italy before relocating to Argentina with the majority of the remaining NDH leadership and an estimated 5,000 to 15,000 Ustaše sympathizers. He established the Croatian Liberation Movement (HOP) in Buenos Aires.

Dinko Sakic was in charge of the Argentinian faction in the 1970s. He was extradited to Croatia in 1999 for war crimes committed during WWII and was sentenced to serve 20 years in prison.

Vjekoslav "Maks" Luburic was one of Pavelić's lieutenants during WWII. Luburić broke off and formed his own group, Otpor-HNO in 1955. This split was apparently due to the fact that Pavelić was willing to give up some historically Croatian land in exchange to reestablish an independent Croatia The working relationship between the two men was a long-standing one, beginning in the 1930s with the Ustashe movement. In 1969, Luburić was assassinated by the Yugoslav secret police, the UDBA.

Attacks 
A number of attacks against Yugoslavia were organized by the Ustasha emigration, including the 1971 killing of ambassador Vladimir Rolović by Miro Barešić and Anđelko Brajković.

Otpor has taken credit for two murders associated with their group and is suspected of one more, according to the Global Terrorism Database (GTD). All three incidents occurred in 1978 in the US within months of each other. The first attack was against Anthony Cikoja on September 28, 1978. Cikoja was a Yugoslavian immigrant, shot and killed by someone in a waiting car outside his home in Greenburgh, New York. This attack happened three months after Cikoja had received a letter from the "Croatian Nationalist Army", demanding a payment of $5,000 towards the cause for independence. The letter also threatened death if he refused. At least 15 other Yugoslav immigrants in the area had received similar letters.

The next incident attributed to Otpor is a firebombing on October 4, 1978. Daniel Nikolic, a Croatian-American businessman, received a letter similar to the one given to Cikoja, demanding money. When he did not respond, his cabinet business was firebombed.

The third and final incident reported in the GTD was on November 22, 1978. This incident was similar to the previous two: the target, Krizan Brkic, also received an extortion letter demanding that he contribute money towards the cause for independence. He was shot and killed outside his home in Glendale, California.

While these are the only attacks reported in the GTD, this does not mean that these incidents were the only attacks perpetrated by the group. It has been suggested that Optor often hire people unrelated to the group to carry out attacks from their headquarters in Chicago. The primary targets of these attacks are Yugoslavian travel agencies and diplomatic facilities. Book bombs, or books hollowed out with explosive centers, were the weapon of choice for Otpor.

On May 23, 1979, a pipe bomb killed two Otpor members riding in a pickup truck in the San Pedro district of Los Angeles, another pipe bomb was recovered from the scene. The FBI believed the bomb detonated accidentally;  it was intended for the homes of two Croatians who had previously received extortion letters. It was the third bombing of its type in the Los Angeles area. Herbert D. Clough, the special agent in charge of the FBI's Los Angeles field office, said the bomb in the pickup truck was similar to those used in two other bombings. After the incidents were publicized, Croatians from across the United States came forward to report extortion letters.

References

Sources
 

Ustaše
Fascist organizations
Organizations established in 1955
Organizations disestablished in 1991
Croatian nationalist terrorism
Defunct organizations designated as terrorist
Terrorism in Yugoslavia